The 2014–15 Northern Counties East Football League season was the 33rd in the history of the Northern Counties East Football League, a football competition in England.

Premier Division

The Premier Division featured 18 clubs which competed in the previous season, along with four new clubs.
Clubs promoted from Division One:
Cleethorpes Town
Shaw Lane Aquaforce
Plus:
Handsworth Parramore, new club formed as a merger of Worksop Parramore and Sheffield & Hallam County Senior League club Handsworth
Worksop Town, demoted from the Northern Premier League

From this league seven teams - Barton Town Old Boys, Cleethorpes Town, Heanor Town, Shaw Lane Aquaforce, Staveley Miners Welfare, Tadcaster Albion and Worksop Town have applied for promotion.

League table

Results

Locations

Division One

Division One featured 18 clubs which competed in the previous season, along with four new clubs:
Clubs relegated from the Premier Division:
Lincoln Moorlands Railway
Winterton Rangers
Plus:
AFC Mansfield, promoted from the Central Midlands League
Penistone Church, promoted from the Sheffield and Hallamshire County Senior League

League table

Results

Locations

League Cup

The 2014–15 Northern Counties East Football League League Cup was the 33rd season of the league cup competition of the Northern Counties East Football League.

First round

 † = After Extra Time

Second round

Third round

 † = After Extra Time

Fourth round

Fifth round

Semi-finals

Final
Match at Staveley Miners Welfare's ground.

References

External links
 Northern Counties East Football League

2014-15
9